Port District Football Club is an Australian rules football club located in Largs Bay, South Australia. The club is successor of Semaphore Central F.C., which merged with Exeter F.C. to form Port District in 1979.

The team played in different leagues of South Australia until they joined "South Australian Amateur Football League" (current Adelaide Footy League) when it was established in 1911.

History

The club was originally established as "LeFevre Peninsula Football Club" and after several name changes, in 1898 it was renamed "Semaphore Central Football Club". During their first years of existence, LeFevre shared grounds with Port Adelaide.

In 1876, the club had to look for a new ground after several members of the team suffered bruises and sprains when an accident occurred with the coach that carried them back to home.

With the former Buck's Flat converted into a cemetery, sports clubs began to look for alternative grounds to play football and cricket. Representatives of football and cricket clubs met at Sayers Port Hotel agreed to acquire the Oval belonging to the Queen & Albert Cricketing Association, currently the Alberton Oval. Port Adelaide was one of the clubs that moved to Alberton Oval, which was leased for 10 years.

In 1881, Mr H. W Thompson was elected president of the club in a meeting at Exeter Hotel. It was also decided that the colours should be blue and white. Alberton Oval would be a frecquent venue for LeFevre Peninsula F.C. during those years. In March 1881, LeFevre played Port Adelaide for the first time. Some footballers that played that season were: T. Hopkins (Captain), R. Gill, E. Hosie, W. Walsh, R. Walsh, R. Raven, H. Grenville, W. Knapman and J. Renfrey. In 1885 the club joined the recently created South Australian Junior Football Association.

The amalgamation of the LeFevre Peninsula and Glanville councils to form the Semaphore Corporation in 1883, made the club change their name to "Semaphore Football Club". There are recordings of a team named "Semaphore Wanderers", which participated in some informal matches in 1895, and two years later the "Semaphore Junior" took part in the Port Adelaide Junior Football Association, playing the Grand Final v Australs which they lost by 3 points. In 1898, the Semaphore F.C. were playing in the Port Adelaide and Suburban Association. The team had adopted blue and red as their colors (blue guernsey with a horizontal red band). Most of the games were played in Bush Oval of Largs Bay.

In 1900, newspapers referred to the club as "Semaphore Central F.C." In 1906 the team embarked on a tour to the South East of South Australia, when they played several clubs of the region. That same year Semaphore won the minor Premiership after beating Norwood II. The team had lost only one single game for the entire season.

By 1908, Semaphore wore a grey jumper with a horizontal black band, which would remain as the main kit during the 1910s, then switching to black with a grey horizontal band. In 1910 a number of players from Semaphore Central were elevated to the senior Port Adelaide team including S. C. Stidston, P. O'Grady and J. Middleton. One year later, Semaphore joined recently formed "South Australian Amateur Football League". The team also developed a long-time rivalry with University F.C.

In 1913, Semaphore Central won their first Premiership in the SAAFL, after defeating Adelaide University at the Grand Final on the Norwood Oval.

The Advertiser wrote about the match:

Nevertheless, the euphoria of Semaphore's first title ended soon so more than half the team were called by the British Empire to fight at World War I. By war’s end in 1918, six heroes from the club’s premiership side were dead.

After that first goal in 1914, Semaphore Central won new Division 1 championships in 1923–1925 (achieving their first trichampionship) and 1928. During the 1930s the team won three titles else, and five titles in the 1950s although Semaphore would not win any championship until 1970. From then on, the team has won only two titles else, the last in 1992.

In 1979, Semaphore Central merged with Exeter Football Club to form "Port District Football Club". Port District set its date of foundation in 1873 as they consider a continuity of Semaphore Central.

In 2014, Port District paid tribute to their fallen soldiers wearing a replica of the 1914 Semaphore jumper.

Uniform evolution

Honours
Premierships won by Port District:

 SAAFL:
 Div 1 (18): 1914, 1923, 1924, 1925, 1928, 1931, 1938, 1939, 1940, 1941, 1947, 1948, 1949, 1956, 1959, 1970, 1972, 1992 
 Div 1R (3): 1979, 1991, 1995
 Div 2 (3): 1979, 1998, 2007 
 Div 2 (1): 2007
 Div 3 (1): 1984
 Div C Grade Premier (5): 1992, 1995, 2000, 2001, 2021

References

External links

Australian rules football clubs in South Australia
Australian rules football clubs established in 1873
1873 establishments in Australia
Adelaide Footy League clubs